Paeonia mascula is a species of peony. Native to Syria, Spain, France, Italy, Croatia, Bosnia and Herzegovina, Serbia, Montenegro, Bulgaria Greece,  Turkey, Iraq, Lebanon and Israel, this wild peony has become naturalised on two small islands in the UK.

Taxonomy
The following subspecies have been defined.
 Paeonia mascula subsp. mascula
 Paeonia mascula subsp. bodurii
 Paeonia mascula subsp. hellenica
 Paeonia mascula subsp. russoi.

Location

Paeonia mascula is at risk in its natural environment due to the demand from private collectors and there is a significant trade in wild P. mascula from Turkey.

Ideal conditions are light (sandy) soils although and most peonies can grow in heavy clay soil. The Wild Peony prefers acid and neutral soils, can grow in semi-shade and tolerates drought.

The wild peony was introduced to the island of Steep Holm in the Bristol Channel, possibly by monks. 37 plants were taken to nearby Flat Holm island by Frank Harris, the farmer at the time, in the 1930s, many of which died during the World War II occupation and fortification of the island. One remaining plant was reintroduced by the Flat Holm Warden in 1982 and is protected by fencing near the path to the lighthouse. A few plants grown from seed also survive in the farmhouse garden.

Flowering cycle

Paeonia mascula flowers for just one week of the year normally in May or June in the Northern Hemisphere, and the seedpods (at one stage referred to as jester's hats develop during the summer before bursting open to scatter seeds in August or September. The flowers are hermaphrodite and pollinated by insects. The plant is self-fertile.

Steep Holm and Flat Holm are the only known places in the UK where the wild peony has naturalised. The likely reason for this is that the islands provide a habitat similar to the Mediterranean islands where the plants originate from and the relative isolation allows them some protection.

Uses
The roots of P. mascula were ground to a powder and used to treat colds and sore throats.

References

mascula
Garden plants
Flora of Bulgaria
Flora of Lebanon
Plants described in 1768
Taxa named by Philip Miller